Silvia Vanessa Ponce de León Sánchez  (born 7 March 1992), known simply as Vanessa Ponce, is a Mexican model and beauty queen who was crowned Miss World 2018. She is the first Mexican to be crowned as Miss World. In the history of the Miss World competition, she holds the record for being the oldest winner thus far.

Life and career

Vanessa Ponce was born in Mexico City, Mexico on 07 March 1992. She studied international commerce at the University of Guanajuato, in the state of Guanajuato. She resided for ten years in the State of Aguascalientes, Mexico, and for five years in the State of Guanajuato. She then returned to her hometown in Mexico City, Mexico to live and work.

She speaks basic English, in addition to her mother tongue Spanish.

During the Miss World 2018 competition, she promoted her project called "Na Vili", whose objective is to help the children of the indigenous Mexican day laborers who emigrated from the State of Guerrero, Mexico to the State of Guanajuato. She also works in a school called Nenemi dedicated to the intercultural education for indigenous people.

In April 14, 2022, She was married to her private boyfriend at Carmel Valley in California, United States.

Pageantry

Mexico's Next Top Model

At the age of 22, she participated in the fifth season of Mexico's Next Top Model, which ran in 2014. At the end of the reality show, she was eventually declared as the winner. Her prize package included a cash prize of Mex$300,000, an appearance at the New York Fashion Week, $50,000 worth of Mary Kay cosmetics, a modeling contract with Queta Rojas management, a Volkswagen Tiguan, $125,000 worth of Tommy Hilfiger apparel and an editorial spread in Glamour magazine.

Miss Mexico 2018

She was crowned Miss Mexico City 2018, and later was crowned Miss Mexico 2018 on May 5, 2018, in the Imperial Hall of Villa Toscana, Sonora, to represent Mexico in Miss World 2018. She was crowned by Miss Mexico 2017 and Miss World Americas 2017 outgoing Andrea Meza from the State of Chihuahua, Mexico.

Miss World 2018
She represented Mexico at the 68th edition of Miss World. During the final question and answer round of the contest, she was asked - “How would you use your influence as Miss World to help others?” she replied by stating:

At the end of the event, she won the title and was crowned Miss World 2018, on 8 December 2018 in the city of Sanya, China. She was crowned by the outgoing titleholder, Manushi Chhillar of India.

Vanessa Ponce de Leon is the oldest Miss World as of now. She won the contest when she was 26 years and 276 days, surpassing the previous record of Miss World 1989, Aneta Kręglicka, who was 24 years old and 244 days old at the time of her victory.

During her reign as Miss World, she lived in  England and visited China, Thailand, Indonesia, India, Uganda, the Philippines, Ghana, Singapore, Poland, Tanzania, the Bahamas and various cities in her home country Mexico.

At the end of her reign, Ponce crowned her successor Toni-Ann Singh of Jamaica as Miss World  2019 in London on 14 December 2019.

On 19th August 2019, she gave an interview in Women Fitness about her exercise routine, diet, workout, skincare and hair care, under the title 'Miss World Vanessa Ponce de León: An Unmatched Beauty'.

References

External links

Official Website

1992 births
Living people
Mexican beauty pageant winners
Mexican female models
Miss World 2018 delegates
Miss World winners